Handy is an unincorporated community in Perry Township, Monroe County, in the U.S. state of Indiana.

History
According to Ronald L. Baker, the community was probably named after Joseph D. Handy, a county commissioner.

Geography

References

Unincorporated communities in Monroe County, Indiana
Unincorporated communities in Indiana